Georgia Pass, elevation , is a mountain pass that crosses the Continental Divide in the Front Range of the Rocky Mountains of Colorado in the United States.

See also 

Southern Rocky Mountains
Rocky Mountain Front
Colorado mountain passes

References

External links 

Landforms of Park County, Colorado
Landforms of Summit County, Colorado
Mountain passes of Colorado
Great Divide of North America